Chlorops pumilionis is a species of pest fly from the family Chloropidae. It is also known as the chloropid gout fly or barley gout fly. It is an oligophagous pest of cereal crops.

Description
The thorax is straw yellow, with three longitudinal nodal stripes. The head has black ocular triangle. The third antennal segment and two last segments of tarsus are black.

Distribution
The fly is widespread in South, North, Central Europe, North America, Africa, and Japan.

Ecology

The gout fly damages 18 species of cultivated and wild cereal plants, wheat, barley, rye, oats, timothy grass and couch grass.

References

Europe

Chloropinae
Diptera of Europe
Diptera of North America
Diptera of Asia
Diptera of Africa
Agricultural pest insects
Insects described in 1778
Articles containing video clips